The 2021 Soul Train Music Awards took place on November 28, 2021, to recognize the best in soul, R&B and Hip-Hop music. The ceremony aired on BET, BET Her, VH1 and MTV2, with actors Tisha Campbell & Tichina Arnold hosting the ceremony for the fourth time. The nominations were announced on November 2, 2021, with H.E.R. leading with eight nominations, followed by Chris Brown with seven. Maxwell was honored with the Legend Award and Ashanti was honored with the Lady of Soul Award for her contributions to the music industry.

Performances

Special Awards
Honorees are as listed below:

Legend Award
Maxwell

Lady of Soul Award
Ashanti

Winners and nominees
Winners are listed below.

Best New Artist
Yung Bleu
Blxst
Capella Grey
Morray
Tems
Tone Stith

Soul Train Certified Award
Charlie Wilson
Anthony Hamilton
Ashanti
Isley Brothers
Jimmy Jam and Terry Lewis
T-Pain

Best R&B/Soul Female Artist
Jazmine Sullivan
Alicia Keys
Doja Cat
H.E.R.
Jhené Aiko
SZA

Best R&B/Soul Male Artist
Giveon
Blxst
Chris Brown
Lucky Daye
Tank
Usher

Best Gospel/Inspirational Award
Kirk Franklin
Brian Courtney Wilson
James Fortune
Kelly Price
Maverick City Music
Tasha Cobbs Leonard

Song of the Year
Silk Sonic (Bruno Mars & Anderson Paak) – "Leave the Door Open"
Blxst  – "Chosen"
H.E.R. – "Damage"
Jazmine Sullivan – "Pick Up Your Feelings"
Wizkid  – "Essence"
Yung Bleu  – "You're Mines Still"

Album of the Year
Jazmine Sullivan – Heaux Tales
Blxst – No Love Lost
Doja Cat – Planet Her
Giveon – When It's All Said and Done... Take Time
H.E.R. – Back of My Mind
Wizkid – Made in Lagos

The Ashford & Simpson Songwriter's Award
Silk Sonic (Bruno Mars & Anderson Paak) – "Leave the Door Open"
Written by Bruno Mars, Brandon Anderson, Dernst Emile II, Christopher Brody Brown
H.E.R.  – "Come Through"
Written by Carl McCormick, Chris Brown, H.E.R., Kelvin Wooten, Michael L. Williams II, Tiara Thomas
H.E.R. – "Damage"
Written by Anthony Clemons Jr., Carl McCormick, H.E.R., James Harris, Jeff Gitelman, Terry Lewis, Tiara Thomas
Jazmine Sullivan – "Pick Up Your Feelings"
Written by Blue June, Chi, Audra Mae Butts, Jazmine Sullivan, Kyle Coleman, Michael Holmes
Tank – "Can't Let It Show"
Written by Kate Bush, Durrell Babbs
Wizkid  – "Essence"
Written by Ayodeji Ibrahim Balogun, Uzezi Oniko, Okiemute Oniko, Richard Isong, Temilade Openiyi

Best Dance Performance
Normani  – "Wild Side" 
Chloe x Halle – "Ungodly Hour"
Chris Brown & Young Thug – "City Girls"
Lizzo  – "Rumors" 
Usher – "Bad Habits"

Best Collaboration
Wizkid  – "Essence" 
Chris Brown & Young Thug  – "Go Crazy" 
Doja Cat  – "Kiss Me More" 
H.E.R.  – "Come Through" 
Jazmine Sullivan  – "Girl Like Me" 
Yung Bleu  – "You're Mines Still"

Video of the Year
Silk Sonic (Bruno Mars & Anderson Paak) – "Leave the Door Open"
Chris Brown & Young Thug  – "Go Crazy" 
H.E.R. – "Damage"
Jazmine Sullivan – "Pick Up Your Feelings"
Normani  – "Wild Side" 
Wizkid  – "Essence"

References 

Soul
Soul Train Music Awards
Soul
Soul